Tony Hirst is an academic in the Department of Computing and Communications at the Open University, but better known for the OUseful Blog on practical applications of open data.

Notable achievements 
In February 2009, Hirst and colleague Joss Winn, established WriteToReply, to re-publish the UK Government's Digital Britain Interim Report in a way that allowed readers to comment on each paragraph. This was among a number of experiments to promote greater online public participation in government consultations.

In March 2009, Hirst created a technique for extracting and presenting subtitles generated from Twitter status updates in SubRip (*.srt) format

Hirst won the 2011 "Open Up" contest for his ideas about the use of UCAS data. The Open Up contest was run by TSO (formerly "The Stationery Office", a publishing company that supplies the UK Government) and came with a £50,000 development fund to enable the idea. Hirst was chosen by a judging panel headed up by TSO director of digital products Robin Brattel, and included artificial intelligence expert Sir Nigel Richard Shadbolt and Open University director of communications Lucian J Hudson.

Hirst was described as "brilliant" by The Guardian data blog for his work analysing the use of Twitter by journalists.

Media work 
Hirst has been an academic adviser and expert contributor to the BBC World Service programme Click, formerly Digital Planet.

He was co-founder of the Open University Robotics Outreach Group, which led to the Blue Peter/RoboFesta Competition in 2001. This competition - which required children to "Design a Really Useful Robot" - had 32,000 entries.

References 

Living people
Academics of the Open University
Year of birth missing (living people)